Armando Martínez Limendu (born August 29, 1961) is a Cuban boxer. At 18 years of age he won the gold medal in the Light Middleweight (71 kg) category at the 1980 Summer Olympics, beating Aleksandr Koshkyn in the final.

In 1982 he won the silver medal at the World Championships in Munich, West Germany, this time losing to Koshkyn. He had previously won a silver medal at the 1978 World Championships.

1980 Olympic results
Below are the results of Armando Martinez, a Cuban light middleweight boxer who competed at the 1980 Moscow Olympics:

 Round of 32: Defeated Zygmunt Gosiewski (Poland) on points, 5-0
 Round of 16: Defeated George Kabuto (Uganda) referee stopped contest in first round
 Quarterfinal: Defeated Francisco de Jesus (Brazil) on points, 5-0
 Semifinal: Defeated Jan Franek (Czechoslovakia) referee stopped contest in second round
 Final: Defeated Aleksandr Koshkyn (Soviet Union) on points, 4-1 (won gold medal)

References

1961 births
Living people
Boxers at the 1980 Summer Olympics
Olympic boxers of Cuba
Olympic gold medalists for Cuba
Olympic medalists in boxing
Cuban male boxers
AIBA World Boxing Championships medalists
Medalists at the 1980 Summer Olympics
Light-middleweight boxers
People from Ciego de Ávila Province